James “Jim” Morphesis (born 1948) is an American painter born to Greek American, parents in Philadelphia, Pennsylvania. He won the Young Talent Award from the Los Angeles County Museum of Art in Los Angeles, California, in 1983.

Biography 
Jim Morphesis, received a Bachelor of Fine Arts degree (BFA) from the Tyler School of Art of Temple University in 1970 and earned his Master of Fine Arts (MFA) from the California Institute of the Arts in 1972.  “In art school and immediately after, he made Minimalist work occasionally employing a crucifix form.”    Art critic, Peter Clothier described the nature of Jim Morphesis's early paintings: ”His early work was characterized by its brooding, dramatic strength, its juxtaposition of structural formality with expressive intensity, its crusty, abstract surfaces which always seemed to reveal less than they concealed."

In 2012, Michael Duncan, independent art curator and critic wrote,“Morphesis’s breakthrough actually came at the end of the 1970s with his use of more overt religious and figurative imagery.”  “Later, bodies of the 1980s work became more sculptural, with crucifix forms used as central structures of layered reliefs.”

Art historian and curator, Peter Selz, PhD stated: “Since the 1980s, Jim Morphesis has been one of the most influential members of the expressionist art movement in Los Angeles”  “As strong examples of Los Angeles Neo-Expressionism, Morphesis’ s works of the 1980s rank alongside those of Carlos Almaraz, David Amico, Gronk, Roger Herman, Margaret Nielson, and Joyce Trieman.  Like those artists, Morphesis has used painting as a vehicle for dramatic personal statements.
Morphesis has had over 42 solo exhibitions and is in numerous museum collections including the Los Angeles County Museum of Art, San Francisco Museum of Modern Art, Oakland Museum of California Art, Metropolitan Museum of Art, Orange County Museum of Art, Newport Beach, CA, Phoenix Art Museum, Portland Art Museum, Portland, Oregon, Museum of Contemporary Religious Art, St. Louis, Missouri, Museum of Contemporary Art San Diego, and the San Antonio Museum of Art.

Awards 

City of Pasadena Arts and Culture III Grant, with Pasadena Museum of California Art
Louis Comfort Tiffany Foundation Biennial Award for Painting and Sculpture, New York, NY, 1985
Young Talent Award, Los Angeles County Museum of Art, (LACMA), Los Angeles, California, 1983
California Small Images Exhibition Purchase Award, California State University, Los Angeles, California, 1971
Nathan Margolis Memorial Award for Painting, Tyler School of Art of Temple University, Philadelphia, PA, 1970

Personal life
Jim Morphesis currently resides and works in Los Angeles, California.

References

External links 
  Official website
  Artist in Residence Fullerton College
  A tribute to artist Jim Morphesis as part of the 7th Street Altarpiece

1948 births
Living people
California Institute of the Arts alumni
Temple University Tyler School of Art alumni
Artists from Philadelphia
Painters from Pennsylvania
American people of Greek descent